The Liberty Landing Ferry, officially known as the Liberty Landing City Ferry, is a water taxi service based at Liberty Landing Marina in Jersey City, New Jersey, United States offering service between Liberty State Park in Jersey City, Liberty Harbor in Jersey City and the Brookfield Place in Battery Park City, Manhattan. It is one of several private operators of ferries, sightseeing boats, and water taxis in the Port of New York and New Jersey.

Service
Liberty Landing Ferry operates a fleet of 2 catamarans, the  Little Lady built in 1999 by Sea Taxi Catamarans Inc., and the  Little Lady II built in 2007 by Sea Taxi Catamarans Inc., on one route. Service is provided on weekdays (except major holidays) year-round, with weekend service provided during the summer. All transfers (except transfers involving the free Downtown Connection bus at the Battery Park City Ferry Terminal) are paid as each system runs independently. Fares are $10 one-way from Manhattan to New Jersey, and $2 one way across the Morris Canal. Discounts for seniors and children, as well as ten-trip and monthly passes are available.

Ownership and other companies

Liberty Landing Ferry is part of Statue Cruises (which in turn is affiliated with by Hornblower Cruises), which also operates ferries to Ellis Island and Liberty Island from Liberty State Park near the Liberty Landing Ferry's slip at the Liberty Landing Marina, and Battery Park in Manhattan. The Battery Park City Ferry Terminal is also used by NY Waterway and NYC Ferry. Other commuter and tourist ferries operating in the Port of New York and New Jersey include the seasonal ferries to Governor's Island, New York Water Taxi, SeaStreak, and the Staten Island Ferry. Circle Line Sightseeing Cruises runs sightseeing tours throughout the port.

See also
List of ferries across the Hudson River to New York City
North River (Hudson River)
Lower Manhattan

References

External links
 Official site
 Hornblower Cruises & Events
 Liberty Landing Marina
 Liberty State Park – New Jersey Division of Parks and Forestry
 Statue Cruises

Ferry companies of New Jersey
Ferry companies of New York City
Ferries of New Jersey
Ferries of New York City
Port of New York and New Jersey
Tourism in New Jersey
Tourism in New York City
Travel and holiday companies of the United States
Transportation in Hudson County, New Jersey
Water transportation in New York City
Tourist attractions in Hudson County, New Jersey
Water taxis